Hot Springs Story is a hot spring business simulation video game developed and published by Kairosoft for the Android, iOS, and the Nintendo Switch. It was released for iOS on February 28, 2011, for Android in 2011, and for Nintendo Switch on October 11, 2018. The game focuses on a hot spring resort which the player is tasked with managing and making a profit from. It received mostly positive reviews from critics. A sequel, Hot Springs Story 2, was released in 2020.

Gameplay
Hot Springs Story focuses on a hot spring resort business, where it is the player's job to expand the resort and to juggle the needs of customers. In order to attract more wealthy clientele, the player must impress guidebook writers who will increase the rating of the establishment. The player must juggle advertising, construction, and using booster items on specific rooms to increase their desirability for customers, all while managing the staff and a number of different issues.

Economy types

Customer Patience
Not all customers are the same, and have different patient levels.

Reception

Although Hot Springs Story received mostly positive reviews, the reception was muted compared to the hype and success that Kairosoft's previous Western release, Game Dev Story, garnered; it received an 83/100 from review aggregator website Metacritic. IGN's Levi Buchanan felt that although it lacked the charm of Game Dev Story, that Hot Springs Story was in some ways deeper, with the building aspects giving it more depth overall. TouchArcade noted that although the game could feel daunting at first, it ultimately was an incredibly deep and addicting simulation game. Pocket Gamer Mike Rose praised the game's content and special features, but felt that the game held little to no direction in the very beginning. Gamezebo's Dan Zuccarelli heavily criticized the game for "playing itself", noting that he fell asleep during one playthrough without it affecting his progress in the game.

References

2011 video games
Android (operating system) games
Business simulation games
IOS games
Video games developed in Japan